Momentum Metropolitan Holdings Limited, formerly MMI Holdings Limited, is a South African based financial services group that is listed on the Johannesburg Stock Exchange.

Overview 
Momentum Metropolitan Holdings Limited engages in long and short-term insurance, asset management, savings, investment and employee benefits through its various brands. The Group has subsidiaries in Botswana, Ghana, Gibraltar, Guernsey, Kenya, Lesotho, Mauritius, Namibia, Nigeria, UK, South Africa and Zambia.

History 
In July 2019 MMI took the decision to change its name from MMI Holdings to Momentum Metropolitan Holdings.  The change aims to promote the well-known brand names of two of the strongest companies within the Group, Momentum and Metropolitan.

MMI Holdings was formed in 2010 when Metropolitan Holdings and Momentum Group, two insurance and financial services companies in South Africa, merged their operations.

Pre-Merger History

Metropolitan Holdings Limited 
Metropolitan was founded in 1898 as Homes Trust Limited and was later acquired by Sanlam in 1918. Sanlam merged Homes Trust Limited with Metropolitan Life Insurance Company Limited (another one of its subsidiaries) to form Metropolitan Homes Trust Life Limited in 1979.

In 1985, Metropolitan Homes Trust Life Limited changed its name to Metropolitan Life Limited (Metlife). Metlife was then listed on the JSE in 1986 and cross listed on the NSX in 1996. The group name was changed to Metropolitan Holdings Limited in 2003. As at the merger date, Metropolitan Holdings was listed on the JSE.

Momentum Group Limited 
Momentum traces its roots from Momentum Life Assurers Limited that was established in 1966 as a life assurance company and Southern Life Association Limited that was incorporated in 1904 as African Life Assurance Society. In 1992, RMB Holdings (RMBH) acquired interest in Momentum Life Assurers Limited.

On April 1, 1998, Anglo American Corporation of South Africa Limited (now Anglo American plc) merged its financial services interests with RMBH in order to achieve the objective of a unified financial services grouping known as First Rand. The transaction required that the business of Momentum Life Assurers Limited was transferred to the Southern Life Association Limited which was renamed FirstRand Insurance Company Limited and much later renamed Momentum Group Limited. As at the merger date, Momentum Group was a wholly owned subsidiary of First Rand.

In 2003, Momentum Group Limited transferred its investment in Discovery Limited to FirstRand Limited for R740 million. This stake was later on unbundled to FirstRand's shareholders including RMBH.

The merger 
On March 31, 2010, Metropolitan Holdings, First Rand and Momentum Group entered into a Merger Agreement that would see the amalgamation of Momentum's business with Metropolitan. FirstRand sold its entire shareholding in Momentum to Metropolitan in consideration for which Metropolitan will issue new Metropolitan ordinary shares to FirstRand. This made Momentum a wholly owned subsidiary of Metropolitan. Metropolitan then transferred its insurance business to Momentum and was renamed MMI Holdings with FirstRand as the largest shareholder.

Post-merger history 
On 7 March 2011, RMB Holdings (RMBH), Remgro and FirstRand spun off their insurance assets to RMI Holdings and separately listing it on the JSE. This process led to the transfer of FirstRand's entire shareholding in MMI Holdings to RMI Holdings. In 2020, Momentum Group started a new business initiative, Momentum Velocity Club, which provides lifestyle and financial planning services to young professionals.

Ownership 
The shares of the stock of MMI Holdings  are traded on the JSE, under the symbol: MMI. As at June 2014, the shareholding in the group's stock was as depicted in the table below:

Governance 
Momentum Metropolitan Holdings Limited is governed by an eighteen-person board of directors with Johnson Njeke serving as the chairman and Hillie Meyer serving as the group chief executive officer.

Controversies

Life insurance payout controversy 
Momentum Group, a subsidiary of MMI Holdings, was the subject of a national controversy in 2018 when it rejected the life insurance claim to the family of Denise Ganas.  Ganas was shot and killed in an attempted hijacking.  Momentum controversially refused to payout the R2.4 million claim arguing that Ganas had a previously undisclosed health condition (high blood sugar levels).  The resulting public outcry resulted in Momentum granting the claim to Ganas' family and discussions with the South African Financial Sector Conduct Authority so as to avoid similar situations in the future.  Momentum agreed to amend its policy to payout life insurance claims up to R3 million resulting from violent crime regardless of pre-existing medical conditions.

See also

References

Insurance companies of South Africa
Financial services companies established in 2010
Companies listed on the Johannesburg Stock Exchange
Financial services companies of South Africa
Companies based in the City of Tshwane
South African companies established in 2010